The 118th Pennsylvania House of Representatives District is located in Lackawanna County and Luzerne County. The 118th district includes the following areas:

 Lackawanna County
 Clifton Township
 Covington Township
 Elmhurst Township
 Jefferson Township
 Madison Township
 Moscow
 Roaring Brook Township
 Spring Brook Township
 Thornhurst Township
 Luzerne County
 Avoca
 Bear Creek Township
 Bear Creek Village
 Buck Township
 Dupont
 Duryea
 Hughestown
 Jenkins Township
 Laflin
 Penn Lake Park
 Pittston
 Pittston Township
 Plains Township
 Yatesville

Representatives

Recent election results

References

External links
District Map from the United States Census Bureau
Pennsylvania House Legislative District Maps from the Pennsylvania Redistricting Commission.  
Population Date for District 45 from the Pennsylvania Redistricting Commission.

Government of Luzerne County, Pennsylvania
Government of Monroe County, Pennsylvania
118